is a Japanese joshi puroresu or women's professional wrestling promotion founded by Mayumi Ozaki. In addition to the contracted members of the roster, Oz Academy has also employed some of the top freelancers in all of joshi puroresu, including Ayumi Kurihara, Hiroyo Matsumoto, Manami Toyota and Tomoka Nakagawa. The promotion has a television deal with Gaora.

History

While working in the Gaea Japan promotion in mid-90s, Ozaki formed the villainous Oz Academy stable with Chikayo Nagashima, Rieko Amano and Sugar Sato, eventually opening a training school under the same name. Oz Academy eventually started promoting sporadic independent events, featuring members of the stable and Ozaki's trainees, with the first event held on June 21, 1998. Following the folding of Gaea Japan in 2005, Ozaki turned Oz Academy into a full promotion with a full schedule of approximately one to two events per month, while also recruiting veteran wrestlers Aja Kong, Dynamite Kansai and Sonoko Kato to serve as the backbone of the promotion. Oz Academy remained without championships for nearly nine years, before introducing the Oz Academy Openweight Championship in March 2007 and the Oz Academy Tag Team Championship in July 2008.

Mayumi Ozaki has always been a focal point of Oz Academy events and storylines, with different variations of her original Oz Academy stable trying to dominate and keep themselves on top of the promotion. The stable has gone under many different names, including D-Fix, Ozaki-gun, Ozaki-gundan, and currently, Seikigun. At the end of each year, Oz Academy allows its fans to vote on different awards, including MVP of the Year, Singles Match of the Year and Tag Team Match of the Year, which are then presented to the winners at the "Best Wizard" award ceremony. Oz Academy is based in Shinjuku, Tokyo and holds most of its events in Shinjuku Face. The promotion itself considers the formation of the stable in 1996 as its starting point and celebrated its 20th anniversary on November 13, 2016.

Roster

Wrestlers

Non-wrestlers

Notable alumni

Notable guests

 Akane Fujita
 Aoi Kizuki
 Hikari Shimizu
 Hiroe Nagahama
 Mika Iwata
 Miku Aono
 Miyuki Takase
 Mochi Miyagi
 Rabbit Miu
 Rydeen Hagane
 Ram Kaicho
 Sawako Shimono
 Tae Honma
 Tequila Saya
 Tomoko Watanabe
 Totoro Satsuki
 Yako Fujigasaki
 Ibuki Hoshi

Championships

Oz Academy Pioneer Championship

The  is a is a women's professional wrestling championship created and promoted by Oz Academy. The main characteristic of the title is that it can only be contested in three-way matches. There have been a total of four reigns shared between four different champions. The current champion is Momoka Hanazono who is in her first reign.

Title history

References

External links 

  
 Official blog 

Oz Academy
1998 establishments in Japan
Japanese promotions teams and stables
Japanese women's professional wrestling promotions
Shinjuku
Sports competitions in Tokyo
Women's wrestling teams and stables